Binlang Islet is an islet located in Lieyu Township, Kinmen County (Quemoy), Taiwan (ROC). The islet can be seen from the shore near Lingshui Lake and from the shore near Shaxi Fort in the southwestern part of Lesser Kinmen (Lieyu) as well as from Siming District, Xiamen (Amoy), Fujian, China (PRC).

History
Since 2006, a swimming competition has been held annually in which the competitors swim from the shore of Lesser Kinmen to that of Xiamen Island (Amoy). In the competition, Binlang Islet serves as a mid-way resting place.

In 2012, fishermen from mainland China were arrested for crossing into the prohibited area and collecting oysters at Binlang Islet.

In December 2018, it was discovered that oyster farming in the vicinity of Binlang Islet was being used as a cover for smuggling oysters to Taiwan.

On the morning of March 16, 2020, three ships from the Coast Guard Administration and Kinmen County government removed illegal fishing nets from the waters around Binlang Islet. More than ten unnamed fishing ships from mainland China were in Kinmen County waters. The mainland China ships rammed a Taiwan (ROC) ship and their crews threw bottles and rocks at the Taiwanese ships.

Gallery

See also
 List of islands of Taiwan
 List of uninhabited islands

References

External links
Swimming across the Taiwan Strait (islet can be seen at 0:16)
烈嶼越界捕魚 民眾網上議論 ('Crossing the Boundary to Fish in Lieyu's Waters-  Public Opinion Online') 

Islands of Fujian, Republic of China
Landforms of Kinmen County
Lieyu Township